The 2022–23 Club América season is the club's 78th consecutive season in the top-flight of Mexican football. The team will participate in the Liga MX.

Coaching staff

Source: Club América

Players

Squad information 

Players and squad numbers last updated on 7 January 2023.Note: Flags indicate national team as has been defined under FIFA eligibility rules. Players may hold more than one non-FIFA nationality.}

Transfers

Summer

In

Out

Winter

In

Out

Pre-season and friendlies
Club América will precede their 2022–23 campaign by taking part in the "Tour Águila" in the United States, and will play a series of mid-season friendlies, including the 2022 Leagues Cup Showcase, and the Copa Sky.

Competitions

Overview

Apertura 2022

Results by round

Clausura 2023

Results by round

Apertura 2022

League table

Matches

Regular phase

Liguilla

Quarter-finals

Semi-finals

Goalscorers

Regular phase

Final phase

Clausura 2023

League table

Matches

Regular phase

Goalscorers

Regular phase

Notes

References 

Club América seasons
America
America